The Illinois Council of Teachers of Mathematics (ICTM) is an organization of mathematics educators in the US state of Illinois. An affiliate of the National Council of Teachers of Mathematics and the National Council of Supervisors of Mathematics, the ICTM was founded in 1949 with 90 members.

Professional Activities
The ICTM is involved in a number of professional activities, including:
 Hosting conferences on math education
 Hosting webinars for professional development
 Publishing its journal, Illinois Mathematics Teacher.
 Offering scholarships to college students. In 2017, the ICTM gave $7,500 in scholarships.

Math Contests
The ICTM offers several math competitions for primary and secondary school students in Illinois.

Grade School Contest
The Grade School Contest is a series of three tests that are given at elementary schools. Each grade level (3-8) competes in its own division. The contest has two components: an individual competition and a team competition. The team competition consists of five student teams who work on 20 questions in 25 minutes. There is no limit to the number of teams that a school may enter. The individual competition is an eight question, 20 minute exam to be completed by each competitor individually. The use of calculators during the contest is encouraged. The top two team scores and top ten individual scores contribute to each school's total score.

Algebra Contest
The Algebra Contest is an individual, 60 minute, 20 question contest for elementary and junior high school students. Each school can submit as many competitors as it wishes. The ten highest individual scores in each school contributes to the school's total score, and the top ten individuals and top ten schools receive special recognition from the ICTM.

High School Contest
Started in 1981, the High School Contest consists of a number of team and individual events, with a regional competition being held in late February and the state competition being held in late April or early May. Schools are separated into divisions by enrollment.

Events

†In all cases, a member of a lower grade may substitute for a member of a higher grade. For example, freshmen, sophomores, and juniors may all compete in the Algebra II Written competition, but not seniors.

Each school can have a maximum of one team per level per event, with the exception of the relay competition, in which schools are permitted a maximum of two teams per level per event. This gives a maximum possible team score of 1306 at the state finals, and a maximum score of 1150 at the regional competition.

References

Mathematics education in the United States